

Courses offered
 B.Sc. Mathematics, B.Sc. Physics, B.Sc. Chemistry
 B.A. Economics, B.A. English
 B.B.A, B.Com
 MCJ

Affiliation
S.E.S. College is affiliated to the Kannur University.

Notable alumni
 K. V. Sumesh, Member of Kerala Legislative Assembly

References

Colleges in Kerala
Universities and colleges in Kannur district
Colleges affiliated to Kannur University
Educational institutions established in 1981
1981 establishments in Kerala